The 2002 African Cup of Nations squads is given as follows:

Group A

Nigeria

Coach:  Shaibu Amodu

Mali

Coach:  Henryk Kasperczak

Liberia

Coach:  Dominic George Vava

Algeria

Coach:  Rabah Madjer

Group B

South Africa

Coach:  Carlos Queiroz

Ghana

Coach: Fred Osam Duodu

Morocco

Coach:  Humberto Coelho

Burkina Faso

Coach:  Jacques Yameogo &  Pihouri Weboanga

Group C

Cameroon

Coach:  Winfried Schäfer

DR Congo

Coach:  Louis Watunda

Togo

Coach:  Bana Tchanilé

Ivory Coast

Coach:  Lama Bamba

Group D

Senegal

Coach:  Bruno Metsu

Egypt

Coach:  Mahmoud Al Gohary

Tunisia

Coach:   Henri Michel

Zambia

Coach:   Roald Poulsen

Notes

References
 RSSSF

Africa Cup of Nations squads
2002 African Cup of Nations